Fabric 63 is a 2012 DJ mix compilation album by Levon Vincent. The album was released as part of the Fabric Mix Series.

Track listing

References

External links
Fabric: Fabric 63
 
 

Fabric (club) albums
2012 compilation albums